Primeval is a 2007 American action-adventure horror film directed by Michael Katleman and starring Dominic Purcell, Orlando Jones, and Brooke Langton.

The film was released on January 12, 2007, receiving negative reviews from critics but grossed $11 million worldwide. Despite its title, it has no relation to the 2007 ITV television series of the same name.

Plot 
In Burundi, a British forensic anthropologist is examining the corpses in a mass grave, claiming they were all killed in an identical manner. When the woman digs her shovel into what she believes is another grave, an unseen creature attacks and violently drags her into the river. The UN soldiers accompanying her fire into the water, but only her mangled corpse floats to the surface - before being devoured.

In a New York City newsroom, television journalist Tim Manfrey (Dominic Purcell) is assigned by his boss, Roger Sharpe (Patrick Lyster), to travel to Burundi with Aviva Masters (Brooke Langton), a reporter who deals with animal stories and has become interested in Gustave, a gigantic, fierce crocodile known to have killed hundreds of people in Africa over the years. With the killing of the anthropologist, Gustave is suddenly a story of interest to the world. Tim doesn't want to go, knowing that Burundi is a war zone, but he has little choice because one of his stories turns out to have been based on falsified evidence. Tim and Aviva are accompanied to Burundi by Tim's cameraman and friend, Steven Johnson (Orlando Jones), and herpetologist Matt Collins (Gideon Emery), who are intent on capturing Gustave alive.

At the airport in Bujumbura they are met by a government official Hahutu Mkwesa who goes by Harry (Dumisani Mbebe), who tries to delay their departure by warning them of unrest in the bush, caused by a dangerous warlord who has nicknamed himself "Little Gustave." Tim manages to overrule Harry by faking a call to Roger, and the team departs the next day being accompanied by two soldiers. When the party reaches the village where the last attack occurred they meet their guide, a licensed hunter named Jacob (Jürgen Prochnow), and are blessed by the local shaman; the friendly villagers assemble a steel cage in order to capture Gustave and take the cage to a nearby swamp. The first attempt to capture Gustave, by placing a goat as bait, fails, but Matt manages to shoot a tracking dart into it.

The next day, Steven happens upon the shaman and his family being executed by men working for Little Gustave and films it. While the others debate airing the footage, "Jojo" (Gabriel Malema), a teenage villager who helped set up the cage, uses himself as live bait to capture Gustave. The beast arrives and tries to devour him, but disappears, as Tim, Matt, and Steven race to rescue him. Meanwhile, Aviva catches one of the soldier escorts stealing money from a tent. The soldier knocks her down and attempts to rape her, but Gustave arrives and kills him. Aviva escapes unharmed and catches up with the others. The remaining guard relays over his radio that the Americans videotaped the shaman's execution. Just as the group realizes that the soldiers work for Little Gustave, the remaining guard, believing Jacob videotaped the evidence, wounds him; Jojo intervenes, and shoots him. While Jacob's wound is being treated, Gustave attacks the group. Jacob recalls the story of how his wife, Ona, was killed by Gustave, and that he swore revenge. Jacob produces a grenade and detonates it as Gustave grabs him in his jaws and devours him, but the grenade fails to kill the crocodile.

The next day, a helicopter arrives to airlift the survivors, but a truck arrives with two of Little Gustave's men, who fire a rocket at the helicopter. The group ducks, except for Matt, who runs after the helicopter to stop it from flying away. Matt is rammed by the truck and shot to death by the younger of the two militia members, a teenager performing what is clearly his first execution. When the driver of the truck notices the rest of the group, Tim yells for them to split up. In the ensuing chase, both of Little Gustave's men are killed: when the truck crashes into the river, the teenager is thrown out and dies on impact, while the driver is shot by Aviva when he tries to strangle Tim.

Steven stumbles upon Gustave and struggles to escape. While Aviva stays with the injured Jojo, Tim goes to look for Steven, but finds only his camera. As they are waiting for help, Tim remarks to Aviva that he now understands the shaman's earlier words that "we make our own monsters." Matt had earlier told the group that crocodiles frequently feed on carrion, and there is no limit to how large they can grow, given enough sustenance; it is the bodies from the civil war, floating in the river, that have given Gustave a taste for human flesh, and allowed him to reach such a gargantuan size as the years go by.

Harry arrives in a Range Rover, but Tim realizes that he is actually Little Gustave upon discovering the shaman's necklace in his possession. Little Gustave wants the video evidence of the shaman’s execution. Tim attempts to trick Harry by giving him the GPS tracker linked to the dart on Gustave, saying it will locate the computer with the video. Harry forces Tim and Aviva to lead them to the "computer." While Harry holds Aviva at gunpoint, Tim and one of Harry's men follow the tracking signal to Gustave's lair, where the crocodile is sleeping. Tim finds Steven's mutilated body, and a combat knife in the scattered human remains, and stabs the guard. At the same moment, Aviva splatters Harry with Matt's container of crocodile pheromones and runs. Gustave wakes up and smells the scent of the pheromones, ignoring Tim and Aviva in favor of devouring Harry.

Tim, Jojo and Aviva climb into the Range Rover, but Gustave attacks through the rear window. Tim stabs the crocodile in the mouth with a machete. Gustave roars in defeat as the others manage to escape. Weeks later, Tim, Aviva, Jojo, and Wiley receive medical treatment and fly back home to America, watching leftover footage of Steven on his camera. The end credits state that the Burundian Civil War ended with a ceasefire in 2005, but Gustave is very much alive and still killing people in the Rusizi River of Burundi.

Cast 
 Dominic Purcell as Tim Manfrey
 Brooke Langton as Aviva Masters
 Orlando Jones as Steven Johnson
 Jürgen Prochnow as Jacob Krieg
 Gideon Emery as Matt Collins
 Gabriel Malema as "Jojo"
 Dumisani Mbebe as Hahutu "Harry" Mkwesa / "Little Gustave"
 Patrick Lyster as Roger Sharpe
 Linda Mpondo as "Gold Tooth"
 Ernest Ndhlovu as Shaman
 Thandi Nugbani as Shaman's Wife
 Kgmotoso Motlosi as Shaman's Son
 Walter Emanuel Jones as Voice

Release 

The film was released on January 12, 2007. It was not screened for critics.

Home media 
The film was released on June 12, 2007 on DVD and Blu-ray.

Reception

Box office 
Primeval was released on January 12, 2007. It grossed $10,597,734 in its North American release adding in $4,693,543 with a total of $15,291,277 worldwide.

The film opened up in fifth place on its opening weekend with $6,792,318 ($6,048,315 if not counting Martin Luther King Day). Its box office results declined by -68.9% by the second weekend of its release. By the time its domestic release closed, it made a total of $10,597,734.

Critical reception 

Primeval received negative reviews. On review aggregator website Rotten Tomatoes, Primeval received an approval rating of 18% based on 56 reviews, and an average rating of 3.46/10. Its consensus reads, "Primeval is a low-quality horror film, which due to the inane political messages does not even qualify as campy fun." On Metacritic, which assigns a normalized rating to reviews, the film has a weighted average score of 35 out of 100, based on 11 critics, indicating "Generally unfavorable reviews".
 
Luke Y. Thompson of The Village Voice gave the film a negative review, writing, "With a little camp this could have been fun, but director Michael Katleman doesn’t play it that way, and even Jürgen Prochnow’s crazed Ahab wannabe is unfortunately understated." Peter Hartlaub from The San Francisco Chronicle stated that the film "almost works as an intentionally stupid action movie", but noted "for every guilty pleasure moment, a failed attempt to inject importance to the plot will shock you back into having a bad time again." A.O. Scott of The New York Times criticized the film's editing, script, and characters. Jon Condit from Dread Central awarded the film a score of 1/5, calling it "a really poor man’s Blood Diamond that just happens to also feature an enormous man-eating crocodile". Condit panned the film's thin characterizations, misleading marketing, and called Purcell "a major miscasting problem". Andrew Smith from Popcorn Pictures rated the film a score of 2/10, writing "The film doesn’t have a clue what it wants to be and switches frequently from generic monster-on-the-loose flick to the dramatic ‘let’s make a statement on Africa’ thriller it clearly has designs on being. Neither works very well."

The film also received criticism from Naturalist Patrice Faye, who stated that the film was "an insult to purists and herpetologists but, above all, an insult to Burundi. It shows the country in a bad light, and the people of Burundi are made out to be savages, barbarians, thieves, and murderers".

See also 
 Gustave (crocodile)
 List of killer crocodile films
 Man-eater

References

External links 
 
 
 
 
 Official Primeval DVD Website
 National Geographic – Gustave: Have You Seen This Crocodile?

2007 films
2000s monster movies
American thriller films
2007 horror films
2000s thriller films
Films about crocodilians
American films based on actual events
Films scored by John Frizzell (composer)
Hollywood Pictures films
American natural horror films
American horror thriller films
Films set in Burundi
Films set in Africa
Films shot in South Africa
2007 directorial debut films
Adventure horror films
2000s English-language films
2000s American films